Food and Agriculture Organization and United Nations has recognised 2023 as 'International Year of Millets or IYM2023 for awareness about health and nutritional benefits of millets.

The Indian Government proposed to celebrate 2023 as International Year of Millets.

Because millets uses less water to produce and grows in less time, it can be an alternative to imported cereals. Millets also have high nutritional values.

Around the world 

 India contributes 80% of millet production in Asia and 20% worldwide. In 2023-24 Union Budget, India declared funds for Millet Research Institute. India will provide millets by Public Distribution System to people of below the poverty line.
 Indian Diplomats visited Nigeria as Millets Specific Visit. India and Nigeria both uses Millet as staple food.

Quote From United Nations and Food & Agriculture Organisation

References 

United Nations observances
2023
Food and Agriculture Organization
Millets